James A. Fields House is a historic home located in the Brookville Heights neighborhood in the East End of Newport News, Virginia. It was built in 1897, and is a two-story, Italianate style red brick dwelling on a raised basement. It features an entrance tower with a low pitched hipped roof and two ten-foot tall two-over-two windows on the first floor.  It was built by the prominent African-American lawyer and politician James A. Fields (1844–1903) and served as the location of the first black hospital in the city, which later became the Whittaker Memorial Hospital.

It was listed on the National Register of Historic Places in 2002.

References

External links
 James A. Field House – blog site

African-American history of Virginia
Houses on the National Register of Historic Places in Virginia
Houses completed in 1897
Italianate architecture in Virginia
Houses in Newport News, Virginia
National Register of Historic Places in Newport News, Virginia
Historic house museums in Virginia
Museums in Newport News, Virginia